Wittich is a surname, and may refer to:

 Paul Wittich (c. 1546 in Breslau – 1586), a Silesia-born astronomer
 Christopher Wittich (1625, in Brieg/Brzeg - 1687, in Leyden), a Silesia-born Dutch theologian
 Ludwig von Wittich (1818-1884), Prussian lieutenant general
 Marie Wittich (1868–1931), a German female operatic soprano
 Paul Wittich (politician) (1877−1957), German social democratic politician in Slovakia 
 Hans Wittich (1899-1995), immigrated to USA with wife, Anna (Pfeiffer) & toddler son Rolf Wittich early 1900s. Mountain climber. First to climb several Canadian Grand Tetons. Was known for giving lectures on mountain climbing at Nature Friend camps all over the USA. Also a talented photographer, he documented many of his and his climbing partner's (Otto) climbs through the 1930s. He earned his living as a sheet metal worker, installing church steeples in the summer, and climbing in the winter.
 Rolf Wittich (1926-2020), son of Hans; Engineer, politician, race car driver and enthusiast
 Art Wittich (born 1957), American politician
 Ines Wittich (born 1969), a German shot putter
 Patrick Wittich (born 1982, Kaiserslautern), a German football player

See also 
 Wittig

German given names
German-language surnames
Surnames from nicknames
Surnames from given names